Spongiispira norvegica is a Gram-negative, aerobic and motile bacterium from the genus of Spongiispira which has been isolated from the sponge Isops phlegraei from the Sula Ridge from the coast of Norway.

References

Oceanospirillales
Bacteria described in 2008